Rommel: Battles for North Africa is a 1988 computer wargame published by Strategic Studies Group.

Gameplay
Rommel: Battles for North Africa is a game in which eight scenarios simulate operational level battles.

Reception
Jay Selover reviewed the game for Computer Gaming World, and stated that "That is the essence of Rommel: good scenarios, good development, good system."

Brian Walker reviewed Panzer Battles and Rommel: Battles for North Africa for Games International magazine, and gave them both a rating of 8 out of 10, and stated that "Despite their hard core titles, there is no reason why either of these games should be restricted to the wargames market. In essence, they are resource management games that should appeal to both military freaks as well as the rest of the gaming fraternity."

Reviews
The Games Machine - Dec, 1989
Computer Gaming World - Dec, 1991

References

External links
Review in Info
Review in Joystick Hebdo (French)
Review in Videogame & Computer World (Italian)
Review in Commodore Computing International

1988 video games
Apple II games
Commodore 64 games
Computer wargames
Cultural depictions of Erwin Rommel
DOS games
Macintosh games
NEC PC-9801 games
Strategic Studies Group games
Turn-based strategy video games
Video games about Nazi Germany
Video games developed in Australia
Video games set in Egypt
Video games set in Libya
Video games set in Malta
Video games set in Tunisia
World War II video games